The Trade Union Congress of Namibia (TUCNA) is one of three national trade union centres in Namibia. TUCNA was formed as a merger between the Namibia Federation of Trade Unions (NAFTU) and the Namibia People’s Social Movement (NPSM) in May 2002. The TUCNA was created by unions which rejected linkages with Namibia's ruling party, the South West Africa People's Organization (SWAPO).

Affiliates
The TUCNA has 13 affiliated member unions with the following estimated membership in 2017.

See also

 Namibia National Labour Organisation (NANLO)
 National Union of Namibian Workers (NUNW)

References

Trade unions in Namibia